Srabani Nanda (also Shrabani Nanda) is an Indian woman sprint runner athlete from Odisha specialized in 4x100m relay, 100 metre and 200 metre sprint events. She belongs to Kandhamal District of Odisha. She trains in Kingston, Jamaica with MVP Track & Field Club under coach Stephen Francis.

Achievements

International
Srabani Nanda was at the Rio Olympics 2016, in the women's 200m category. Srabani clocked 23.07 seconds at the G Kosanov Memorial Meet in Almaty 2016 to seal her berth. The qualifying mark was set at 23.20 seconds. She won a gold medal and silver medal in 200 and 100 metre sprint respectively at the 2016 South Asian Games in Assam. She also helped India win a bronze medal in women's 4x100 metre relay event of the 2010 Commonwealth Games with a timing of 45.25 seconds at the  Jawaharlal Nehru Stadium in Delhi on 12 October 2010.
She had been part of the girls 4x100 metre relay gold in the 2008 Commonwealth Youth Games at Pune and she won a bronze medal in both the 100 and 200 metre sprint events of the SAF Games in Colombo in 2007.

In 2017 she won a bronze medal at the 2017 Asian Athletics Championships – Women's 400 metres in Bhubaneswar. In the relay with Dutee Chand, Merlin K Joseph and Himashree Roy.

National
Nanda won two silver medals in women's 100m sprint (11.98 secs) and 4x100m relay with Anuradha Biswal, Renubala Mahanta and Saraswati Chand in the 15th National Senior Federation Cup Athletics Championship held at Ranchi, Jharkhand from 1 to 4 May 2010. She collected another double, winning the u-20 girls 100m (12.11s) and 200m (25.04s)gold medals in the 25th National Junior Athletics Championship at Warangal (AP) on 20 November 2009.

References

External links
World Athletics

Sportswomen from Odisha
1991 births
Living people
Indian female sprinters
21st-century Indian women
21st-century Indian people
Olympic athletes of India
People from Phulbani
Athletes (track and field) at the 2010 Asian Games
Athletes (track and field) at the 2014 Asian Games
Athletes (track and field) at the 2010 Commonwealth Games
Athletes (track and field) at the 2014 Commonwealth Games
Athletes (track and field) at the 2022 Commonwealth Games
Commonwealth Games bronze medallists for India
Athletes (track and field) at the 2016 Summer Olympics
Commonwealth Games medallists in athletics
Athletes from Odisha
South Asian Games gold medalists for India
South Asian Games silver medalists for India
Asian Games competitors for India
South Asian Games medalists in athletics
Olympic female sprinters
Medallists at the 2010 Commonwealth Games